Allphones was an Australian telecommunications retailer which specialised in offering a wide range of mobile and broadband related services across a range of carriers. The Allphones name is now only used for an online store, which is operated by Australian retailer Mobileciti.

Allphones was started in 1989 with the first store in Mile End, South Australia. The company franchised a further 14 stores in South Australia before it was sold in 2000 by Brian and Helen Werner. There was also some sites in NSW like Westfield Parramatta and sponsored Sydney Super Dome from 1st September 2011 until 11 April 2016.

Allphones entered voluntary administration in February 2017, leading to the closure of all 18 company-owned stores.

References

Mobile phone companies of Australia
Privately held companies of Australia